Matías Alberto Sánchez Herrera (born 8 May 1990) is a Chilean footballer who plays as a forward for Deportes Copiapó.

Career
Sánchez's first team was Deportes Copiapó of Primera B de Chile. He played twenty-seven times and scored one goal in 2008, prior to joining fellow Primera B side Unión La Calera in 2009. He remained with the club for three seasons and played ten times, including twice in the 2011 Primera Division season following promotion in 2010. Sánchez returned to Deportes Copiapó, now in the Segunda División, in 2012. In the third tier, he scored fifteen goals in twenty-five matches as Copiapó won promotion. Sánchez had spells with Huachipato and Concepción between 2014 and 2016; playing forty times, scoring four goals.

Sánchez returned to Deportes Copiapó for a third time in June 2016. A year later, Sánchez left Chilean football for the first time to sign for Swedish Division 1 Norra side Arameisk-Syrianska IF. He departed at the end of 2017 after four goals, including two in a 5–3 win over Umeå FC, in seven matches. In January 2018, Sánchez returned to Chile to join San Marcos. His 200th appearance came on 17 February in a 2–5 loss to ex-club Deportes Copiapó. In 2019, Sánchez rejoined Deportes Copiapó for a fourth stint.

Career statistics
.

References

External links

1990 births
Living people
People from Copiapó
Chilean footballers
Association football forwards
Chilean expatriate footballers
Expatriate footballers in Sweden
Chilean expatriate sportspeople in Sweden
Primera B de Chile players
Chilean Primera División players
Segunda División Profesional de Chile players
Ettan Fotboll players
Deportes Copiapó footballers
Unión La Calera footballers
C.D. Huachipato footballers
Deportes Concepción (Chile) footballers
Arameisk-Syrianska IF players
San Marcos de Arica footballers